The Crown Trust Company was an Ontario-based firm that operated in most of Canada prior to its bankruptcy, along with several other trusts, in 1983. The bankruptcies occurred when a major Canadian recession drove down speculative real estate values into which the trusts had made increasingly bad loans during a period of rising inflation and interest rates. Crown Trust, and many other Canadian financial institutions, were left with an overwhelming volume of defaulted mortgages.

History

In January 1946, the Trust and Guarantee Company Limited acquired Crown Trust. For one year it operated under the name the Crown Trust and Guarantee Company. In December 1947 it was renamed the Crown Trust Company.

It eventually came to be controlled by Argus Corporation.

References

Trust companies of Canada
Defunct financial services companies of Canada